Gurdwara Likhansar Sahib is an historical Gurdwara situated in Talwandi Sabo (District Bhathinda) in Punjab, India.

See also 
 Damdami Taksal
 Gurdwara Dam Dama Sahib
 Balwant Singh Nandgarh

References

Sikh places
Sikh architecture
Gurdwaras in Punjab, India
Bathinda
Religious tourism in India
18th-century gurdwaras